Fei Gaoyun (born August 1971) is a Chinese politician serving since 2018 as the Vice Governor of Jiangsu. Fei worked his way up the ranks from the grassroots level.

Fei was born in Huai'an, Jiangsu. He graduated from Yangzhou Technology Institute (now part of Yangzhou University) with a major in electronics. He also has a Master of Public Administration from Nanjing University. He began his career in the Communist Youth League organization in Hanjiang County (near Yangzhou). He once worked as a magistrate of a township. He then served as the mayor of Yizheng, then district governor of Tongzhou District, Nantong, and party chief of Qidong. In February 2013 he was named deputy party chief of Changzhou, then in July, acting mayor of Changzhou, confirmed in January 2014. At the time of his confirmation as mayor, Fei became the first official born after 1970 to serve as a prefecture-level mayor in Jiangsu province.

In January 2018, Fei was named vice-governor of Jiangsu.

References 

Politicians from Yantai
1971 births
Living people
Political office-holders in Jiangsu
Yangzhou University alumni
People's Republic of China politicians from Shandong
Chinese Communist Party politicians from Shandong